The 2017 NCAA Division I baseball tournament began on June 1, 2017 as part of the 2017 NCAA Division I baseball season. The 64-team, double-elimination tournament concluded with the 2017 College World Series (CWS) in Omaha, Nebraska. The CWS started on June 17 and ended on June 27.

The 64 participating NCAA Division I college baseball teams were selected out of an eligible 299 teams. Thirty-one teams were awarded an automatic bid as champions of their conferences, and 33 teams were selected at-large by the NCAA Division I Baseball Committee.

Teams were divided into sixteen regionals of four teams, which conducted a double-elimination tournament.  Regional champions then faced each other in Super Regionals, a best-of-three-game series, to determine the eight participants in the College World Series.

Bids

Automatic bids

By conference

National seeds
The following eight teams automatically host a Super Regional if they advance to that round:
Oregon State
North Carolina †
Florida
LSU
Texas Tech †
TCU
Louisville
 †

Bold indicates College World Series participant
† indicates teams that were eliminated in the Regional Tournament
‡ indicates teams that were eliminated in the Super Regional Tournament

Regionals and Super Regionals
Bold indicates winner.  Seeds for regional tournaments indicate seeds within regional.  Seeds for super regional tournaments indicate national seeds only.

Corvallis Super Regional

Long Beach Super Regional

Tallahassee Super Regional

Baton Rouge Super Regional

Gainesville Super Regional

Fort Worth Super Regional

Louisville Super Regional

College Station Super Regional
Hosted by Texas A&M at Olsen Field at Blue Bell Park

College World Series
The College World Series is held at TD Ameritrade Park in Omaha, Nebraska.

Participants

Bracket
Seeds listed below (in the column before each team's name) indicate national seeds only

Game results

All-Tournament Team
The following players were members of the College World Series All-Tournament Team.

Final standings
Seeds listed below indicate national seeds only

Record by conference

The columns RF, SR, WS, NS, CS, and NC respectively stand for the Regional Finals, Super Regionals, College World Series Teams, National Semifinals, Championship Series, and National Champion.

Nc is non–conference records, i.e., with the records of teams within the same conference having played each other removed.

Media coverage

Radio
NRG Media provided nationwide radio coverage of the College World Series through its Omaha station KOZN, in association with Westwood One. It was streamed at  westwoodonesports.com, on TuneIn, and on SiriusXM. Kevin Kugler and John Bishop called all games leading up to the Championship Series with Gary Sharp acting as the field reporter. The Championship Series was called by Kugler and Scott Graham with Bishop acting as field reporter.

Television
ESPN carried every game from the Regionals, Super Regionals, and College World Series across its networks. During the Regionals and Super Regionals ESPN offered a dedicated channel, ESPN Bases Loaded (carried in the same channel allotments as its "Goal Line" and "Buzzer Beater" services for football and basketball), which carried live look-ins and analysis across all games in progress.

Broadcast assignments

Regionals
Steve Lenox and JT Snow: Stanford, California
Jason Benetti and Todd Walker: Tallahassee, Florida
Anish Shroff and Jay Walker: Lexington, Kentucky
Roy Philpott and Rusty Ensor: Clemson, South Carolina
Jim Barbar  and JP Arencibia: Chapel Hill, North Carolina
Mike Morgan and Nick Belmonte: Gainesville, Florida
Richard Cross and David Dellucci: Hattiesburg, Mississippi
Tom Hart and Chris Burke: Louisville, Kentucky
Super Regionals
Tom Hart, Kyle Peterson, Chris Burke, and Laura Rutledge: Louisville, Kentucky
Mike Morgan and Jay Walker: College Station, Texas
Anish Shroff and Gabe Gross: Long Beach, California
Jason Benetti and Mike Rooney: Corvallis, Oregon
College World Series
Tom Hart, Chris Burke, Ben McDonald, and Mike Rooney: Afternoons, Wed night
Karl Ravech, Eduardo Pérez, Kyle Peterson, and Laura Rutledge: Evenings minus Wed

Regionals
Doug Sherman and John Gregory: Winston-Salem, North Carolina
Trey Bender and Jerry Kindall: Lubbock, Texas
Lowell Galindo and Keith Moreland: Houston, Texas
Alex Perlman and Lance Cormier: Fayetteville, Arkansas
Dave Neal and Ben McDonald: Baton Rouge, Louisiana
Mike Couzens and Greg Swindell: Fort Worth, Texas
Roxy Bernstein and Wes Clements: Corvallis, Oregon
Clay Matvick and Kyle Peterson: Long Beach, California
Super Regionals
Clay Matvick and Eduardo Pérez: Tallahassee, Florida
Dari Nowkhah and Carlos Peña: Gainesville, Florida
Lowell Galindo and Keith Moreland: Fort Worth, Texas
Dave Neal and Ben McDonald: Baton Rouge, Louisiana
College World Series Championship Series
Karl Ravech, Eduardo Pérez, Kyle Peterson, and Laura Rutledge

References

NCAA Division I Baseball Championship
Tournament
NCAA Division I baseball
Baseball competitions in Omaha, Nebraska
Baseball in Baton Rouge, Louisiana
Baseball in the Dallas–Fort Worth metroplex
Baseball competitions in Houston
Baseball in Lubbock, Texas
College baseball tournaments in Arkansas
College baseball tournaments in California
College baseball tournaments in Florida
College baseball tournaments in Kentucky
College baseball tournaments in Mississippi
College baseball tournaments in Nebraska
College baseball tournaments in Oregon
College baseball tournaments in North Carolina
College baseball tournaments in South Carolina
College baseball tournaments in Texas
2017 in sports in Nebraska
Events in Lubbock, Texas